Ver or VER may refer to:

 Voluntary Export Restraints, in international trade
 VER, the IATA airport code for General Heriberto Jara International Airport
 Volk's Electric Railway, Brighton, England
 VerPublishing, of the German group VDM Publishing, reproduces Wikipedia content
 Voluntary Emission Reduction (or Verified Emission Reduction), used for carbon credits
 Ver (command), a shell command in DOS, Windows etc.
 an abbreviation for "versine", a trigonometric function
 ver (function prefix) (versus), a prefix for versed trigonometric functions in mathematics
 an abbreviation for "version"
places in France:
Ver, Manche, in the Manche département 
Ver-lès-Chartres, in the Eure-et-Loir département 
Ver-sur-Launette, in the Oise département 
Ver-sur-Mer, in the Calvados département 
River Ver, in Hertfordshire, United Kingdom
Ver, Belgium, a small village in the municipality of Houyet, Belgium
Roger Ver, a Bitcoin entrepreneur
Ver (music), songs in pre-marriage ceremonies in Goa

See also
Vera (disambiguation)
Vere (disambiguation)
Verus (disambiguation)
WER (disambiguation)
Wehr (disambiguation)